Wheatland (also called Pasadena) is an unincorporated community within Manchester Township in Ocean County, New Jersey, United States.

The Pasadena Wildlife Management Area is located east of the settlement.

History
Sand—mined from nearby pits—was used to manufacture clay drain pipes at a factory erected at Wheatland during the 1870s.

In 1882, Wheatland had a post office, and a population of 125.

References

Manchester Township, New Jersey
Unincorporated communities in Ocean County, New Jersey
Unincorporated communities in New Jersey